Another Way is the debut studio album by American punk rock/pop punk band Teenage Bottlerocket, released on October 31, 2003. It was released by independent record labels One Legged Pup Records, on 12-inch vinyl format, and Red Scare Industries, on 7-inch and CD format. Later, in 2008, the album was released digitally. In March 2011, a "deluxe edition" of the album, containing tracks from the band's 2002 EP A-bomb and the band's tracks from a split 7-inch with Bill the Welder, was released by Red Scare Industries.

Track listing
 "Be Stag" – 2:12
 "Patrick" – 0:50
 "Go-Go" – 1:46
 "She Can't Think" – 1:28
 "Senior Prom" – 2:01
 "Mini Skirt" – 1:48
 "Pull the Plug" – 2:02
 "Rebound" – 2:23
 "Opportunity" – 2:48
 "Rathead" – 1:33
 "Another Way" – 3:24

Deluxe edition bonus tracks
 "A-Bomb"
 "Teenwolf"
 "Going Slow"
 "Job on Me"
 "Go Away"
 "Why I Let You Go"

Personnel
 Ray Carlisle – bass, vocals 1-17
 Joel Pattinson – guitar, backing vocals 1–11, 16-17
 Zach Doe – guitar 12-15
 Brandon Carlisle – drums 1-17

References

2003 debut albums
Teenage Bottlerocket albums
One Legged Pup Records albums